Holiday Affair is a 1996 American Christmas comedy film, directed by Alan Myerson with a story by John D. Weaver. It is a remake of the 1949 RKO film of the same name which starred Robert Mitchum and Janet Leigh.

Plot summary

Cast 
 Cynthia Gibb as Jodie Ennis
 David James Elliott as Steve Mason
 Curtis Blanck as Timmy Ennis
 Al Waxman as Mr. Corley
 Tom Irwin as Paul Davis
 George R. Robertson (as George Robertson)
 Patricia Hamilton as Susan Ennis
 Victor Ertmanis
 Pam Hyatt as Emily Chambers (as Pamela Hyatt)
 Christina Collins
 James Binkley
 Allegra Fulton
 Derek Keurvorst
 Avril Garrett
 Jesse Cairns
 David Huband

Reception

See also
 Holiday Affair (1949) 
 List of Christmas films

References

External links 
 
 
 

1996 television films
1996 films
American Christmas comedy films
Remakes of American films
American television films
Films directed by Alan Myerson
Films scored by Lee Holdridge
1990s Christmas films
1990s Christmas comedy films
Christmas television films
Films shot in Ontario
1990s American films